The Nueva Plaza Cartel is a Mexican criminal organization from the state of Jalisco. The group began as a split from the Jalisco New Generation Cartel, having an important presence in the Guadalajara metropolitan area, having been previously commanded by Carlos Enrique Sánchez Martínez, "El Cholo," Emilio Alejandro Pulido Saldaña, "El Tiburón," and Érick Valencia Salazar "El 85". El Cholo would be killed in 2021, with  "El Tiburón" surrendering himself to Mexican authorities soon afterwards. El 85 would be arrested in 2022.

History
The Nueva Plaza Cartel was born in 2018, as a split from the CJNG. El Salto, Chapala, Juanacatlán, Poncitlán, Tlajomulco de Zuñiga and Ixtlahuacán de los Membrillos are the areas they dispute.  El Cholo separated from the CJNG, when he was accused of treason after the murder of "El Colombiano", an important financial operator of the criminal organization. The group was initially commanded by Carlos Enrique Sánchez "El Cholo" and Érick Valencia, "El 85" (the latter one of the founders of the CJNG), which had supposedly been betrayed. CJNG co-founder Emilio Alejandro Pulido Saldaña, "El Tiburón," would join the Nueva Plaza Cartel as well and was one of the cartel's first bosses. It is reported that the group disputes the municipalities of Zapopan, Tonalá, Tlajomulco de Zúñiga and Tlaquepaque, the main centers of operations of both drug cartels, in addition to having funding from the Sinaloa Cartel. Before the death of "El Cholo", he mentioned in a video, an alleged union with Omar García Harfuch to fight against the CJNG, in addition to being awarded the Tonalá massacre. The group is also known for having an easy irruption with the police forces. 

El Cholo previously assassinated a CJNG financier and after El Mencho attempted to retaliate with a failed coup against El Cholo, the Cartel Nuevo retaliated by successfully assassinating the leader of the CJNG assault squad. The group also was involved in the murder of civilians and criminals, who ended up burying them in clandestine graves, such as those found in the municipalities of Tlajomulco de Zúñiga and Zapopan.

On 18 March 2021, members of the CJNG killed El Cholo, but not before questioning him (the latter recorded on video), claiming responsibility for the wave of violence that occurred in Jalisco during those weeks. The body of El Cholo was abandoned in a public square in the municipality of Tlaquepaque, along with a drug message embedded in his torso with a knife. The abandonment of the body in a public square was seen by various media as proof of the ungovernability of the area. According to the autopsy carried out by forensics, It was revealed that El Cholo had seven of his toes broken and one cut off, Both legs broken at the level of the tibia, kneecap, and femur, as well as marks by electric tweezers, his eyes and tongue were extracted while he was still alive, as well as several other injuries around his body such as knife lacerations and broken ribs along with three bullet wounds to the head, Which was the presumed cause of death. After the death of El Cholo, it is known that the successor is Erick Valencia Salazar "El 85", who is handling the cartel with a lower profile.

In March 2021, El Tiburón, who was now the Nueva Plaza Cartel's second-in-command, surrendered to Mexican authorities soon after El Cholo's murder.

On 4 September 2022, El 85 and two of his associates were arrested by Mexican Army and National Guard forces in the Jalisco town of Tapalpa.

References

Organizations established in 2018
2018 establishments in Mexico
Drug cartels in Mexico
Mexican drug war
Jalisco